Argenvières is a commune in the Cher department in the Centre-Val de Loire region of France.

Geography

Population

Places of interest
 The church of St.Martin, dating from the seventeenth century.
 The château les Rauches, dating from the fourteenth century.
 The château la Charnaye, dating from the sixteenth century.

See also 
 Communes of the Cher department
 Pierre Cotignon de la Charnaye

References

Communes of Cher (department)